On 4 December 2021, a unit of 21st Para Special Forces of the Indian Army killed six civilians near the village of Oting in the Mon District of Nagaland,India. Eight more civilians and a soldier were killed in subsequent violence. The killings were widely condemned with many calling to repeal and revoke the Armed Forces Special Powers Act.

Background 
Nagaland has been long beset with secessionist politics, often spilling into armed insurgency, to which the government has responded with a heavy presence of armed forces. In 1958, the Parliament of India enacted the Armed Forces Special Powers Act, which granted considerable leeway to armed forces and eliminated procedural safeguards. Civil society has accused the Indian Army of engaging in rampant human rights violations, including rape and extrajudicial murders under the cover of this law.

Oting is a village in Upper Nagaland, within the Mon community development block. In the last census (2011), total population stood at 1266; 99% of them were classed under scheduled tribes with a 29% literacy rate. About 45.4% had annual employment exceeding half-a-year and were mostly cultivators; another 9.1% were "marginal workers" and mostly employed in household industries for less than 3 months.

Incidents

Ambush 
On the evening of 4 December 2021 at around 4:00–5:00p.m. IST, a unit of 21 Para Special Forces ambushed an open-bed pickup truck—carrying civilians from Oting village who were returning from a coal mine at Tiru—and opened fire. Six people died, and two received serious injuries.

The Army claims to have been the victim of an intelligence failure; they had suspected the vehicle to contain Naga insurgents. They further claim to have only opened fire when instructions to the vehicle to stop were not followed. The two survivors reject the claims, as did Nagaland Police upon a preliminary inquiry.

Discovery of Bodies 
Neighboring villagers—apprehensive about the gunshots and villagers who were yet to return back—soon arrived at the scene and intercepted a convoy of military vehicles; the troops claimed to be reinforcements who were shifting "injured people" to hospital and feigned ignorance about why the pickup truck stood splattered with blood. Subsequently, they were found to be transporting the dead to their base camp while also trying to change the attire of the deceased, evidently to stage an encounter.

In the ensuing melee, tires of army vehicles were punctured, and three vehicles torched; in accompanying gunfire, seven civilians were killed and twenty injured. The Indian Army claimed troops were attacked by machete-wielding villagers and opened fire only under compulsion, as one infantryman was dead and others injured. Villagers rejected the claims and accused the Army of indiscriminate shooting. Nyawang Konyak, president of the Bharatiya Janata Party’s district unit claimed to have been fired at by Indian army soldiers despite his vehicle displaying a party-flag.

Aftermath

Protests and remembrance 
The following day, the Government of Nagaland imposed Section 144 in Mon District to restrict public assembly and movement; mobile internet and bulk SMS services were indefinitely suspended. Despite, public protests were organized — hundreds of men entered into a local camp of Assam Rifles in Mon Town during which one more civilian was killed.

The Eastern Nagaland People’s Organisation (ENPO), which represents six tribes, withdrew from the ongoing annual Hornbill Festival. The Nagas hoisted black flags on all its morungs at the festival while the Konyaks decided to have its cultural troupe abstain from participating at the festival. This was followed by the other Naga cultural troupes also abstaining on 5 December. Two minutes of silence were also observed at the venue on the same day. Later on the evening of 5 December, the people of Kohima observed a power blackout for 30 minutes to mourn the death of the civilians. Candlelight marches were organised in Kohima, Dimapur and other towns on the same day. A six-hour shutdown was also called by the Naga Students' Federation. On 7 December, the Government of Nagaland announced that it would suspend all activities at the Hornbill Festival.

Politics 
Amit Shah, Minister of Home Affairs of India, regretted the killings before the Parliament—which was in session—, and tasked a Special Investigation Team to complete an enquiry within a month; however, he reiterated the narrative of Indian Army in toto. The opposition staged a walkout in protest and later, condemned the government preventing political from accessing the area.

Even members of the state BJP unit and its political allies reject Shah's narrative — party president Temjen Imna Along held the event to be "summary execution as well as genocide." The local village council has since issued an informal ban on Indian Army entering into the village.

Investigations 
On 6 December, the Nagaland Police registered a First information report against the 21 Para Special Forces, bringing charges of first degree murder. The National Human Rights Commission of India has sent notices to the central and the state governments.

The Indian Army constituted a Court of Inquiry headed by a Major General to probe the circumstance under which the operation took place. In addition, it will also examine the credibility of the intelligence report which led to the detachment of the 21 Para Special Forces led by an officer of the rank of Major.

Funeral 
On 6 December, all fifteen civilian casualties were interred in a mass funeral service, led by Chief Minister Neiphiu Rio.

Legacy 
The incident infused vigor into calls to repeal and revoke the Armed Forces Special Powers Act. On 7 December, the Government of Nagaland announced that it would officially seek its repeal.

See also
 List of massacres in Nagaland
 List of massacres in India

References

External links 

Killings
2021 murders in India
21st-century mass murder in India
December 2021 events in India
Indian Army
Mass murder in 2021
Massacres in 2021
2021 killings
Massacres committed by India